This is a list of the bird species recorded in North Korea. The avifauna of North Korea include a total of 386 species, one of which is introduced.

This list's taxonomic treatment (designation and sequence of orders, families and species) and nomenclature (common and scientific names) follow the conventions of The Clements Checklist of Birds of the World, 2022 edition. The family accounts at the beginning of each heading reflect this taxonomy, as do the species counts found in each family account.

The following tag has been used to highlight extirpated species. The commonly occurring native species are untagged.

(A) Accidental - a species that rarely or accidentally occurs in North Korea
(I) Introduced - a species introduced to North Korea as a consequence, direct or indirect, of human actions
(Ex) Extirpated - a species that no longer occurs in North Korea although populations exist elsewhere

Ducks, geese, and waterfowl
Order: AnseriformesFamily: Anatidae

Anatidae includes the ducks and most duck-like waterfowl, such as geese and swans. These birds are adapted to an aquatic existence with webbed feet, flattened bills, and feathers that are excellent at shedding water due to an oily coating.

Snow goose, Anser caerulescens (A)
Swan goose, Anser cygnoides
Greater white-fronted goose, Anser albifrons
Lesser white-fronted goose, Anser erythropus (A)
Taiga bean-goose, Anser fabalis
Tundra bean-goose, Anser serrirostris
Brant, Branta bernicla (A)
Cackling goose, Branta hutchinsii (A)
Mute swan, Cygnus olor (A)
Tundra swan, Cygnus columbianus
Whooper swan, Cygnus cygnus
Ruddy shelduck, Tadorna ferruginea (A)
Common shelduck, Tadorna tadorna (A)
Mandarin duck, Aix galericulata
Baikal teal, Sibirionetta formosa
Garganey, Spatula querquedula
Northern shoveler, Spatula clypeata
Gadwall, Mareca strepera
Falcated duck, Mareca falcata
Eurasian wigeon, Mareca penelope
Eastern spot-billed duck, Anas zonorhynchaMallard, Anas platyrhynchos
Northern pintail, Anas acuta
Green-winged teal, Anas crecca
Common pochard, Aythya ferina
Baer's pochard, Aythya baeri (A)
Tufted duck, Aythya fuligula
Greater scaup, Aythya marila
Harlequin duck, Histrionicus histrionicus
Surf scoter, Melanitta perspicillata (A)
Stejneger's scoter, Melanitta stejnegeri
Black scoter, Melanitta americana
Long-tailed duck, Clangula hyemalis
Common goldeneye, Bucephala clangula
Smew, Mergellus albellus
Common merganser, Mergus merganser
Red-breasted merganser, Mergus serrator
Scaly-sided merganser, Mergus squamatus (A)

Pheasants, grouse, and alliesOrder: GalliformesFamily: Phasianidae

The Phasianidae are a family of terrestrial birds. In general, they are plump (although they vary in size) and have broad, relatively short wings.

Hazel grouse, Tetrastes bonasia
Black grouse, Lyrurus tetrix
Ring-necked pheasant, Phasianus colchicus
Japanese quail, Coturnix japonica

GrebesOrder: PodicipediformesFamily: Podicipedidae

Grebes are small to medium-large freshwater diving birds. They have lobed toes and are excellent swimmers and divers. However, they have their feet placed far back on the body, making them quite ungainly on land. 

Little grebe, Tachybaptus ruficollis
Horned grebe, Podiceps auritus
Red-necked grebe, Podiceps grisegena
Great crested grebe, Podiceps cristatus
Eared grebe, Podiceps nigricollis

Pigeons and dovesOrder: ColumbiformesFamily: Columbidae

Pigeons and doves are stout-bodied birds with short necks and short slender bills with a fleshy cere. 

Rock pigeon, Columba livia (I)
Hill pigeon, Columba rupestris
Oriental turtle-dove, Streptopelia orientalis
Eurasian collared-dove, Streptopelia decaocto (A)
Red collared-dove, Streptopelia tranquebarica (A)

SandgrouseOrder: PterocliformesFamily: Pteroclidae

Sandgrouse have small, pigeon like heads and necks, but sturdy compact bodies. They have long pointed wings and sometimes tails and a fast direct flight. Flocks fly to watering holes at dawn and dusk. Their legs are feathered down to the toes.

Pallas's sandgrouse, Syrrhaptes paradoxus (A)

BustardsOrder: OtidiformesFamily: Otididae

Bustards are large terrestrial birds mainly associated with dry open country and steppes in the Old World. They are omnivorous and nest on the ground. They walk steadily on strong legs and big toes, pecking for food as they go. They have long broad wings with "fingered" wingtips and striking patterns in flight. Many have interesting mating displays. 

Great bustard, Otis tarda (Ex)

CuckoosOrder: CuculiformesFamily: Cuculidae

The family Cuculidae includes cuckoos, roadrunners and anis. These birds are of variable size with slender bodies, long tails and strong legs. The Old World cuckoos are brood parasites.

Northern hawk-cuckoo, Hierococcyx hyperythrus
Lesser cuckoo, Cuculus poliocephalus
Indian cuckoo, Cuculus micropterus
Common cuckoo, Cuculus canorus
Oriental cuckoo, Cuculus optatus

Nightjars and alliesOrder: CaprimulgiformesFamily: Caprimulgidae

Nightjars are medium-sized nocturnal birds that usually nest on the ground. They have long wings, short legs and very short bills. Most have small feet, of little use for walking, and long pointed wings. Their soft plumage is camouflaged to resemble bark or leaves.

Gray nightjar, Caprimulgus jotaka

SwiftsOrder: CaprimulgiformesFamily: Apodidae

Swifts are small birds which spend the majority of their lives flying. These birds have very short legs and never settle voluntarily on the ground, perching instead only on vertical surfaces. Many swifts have long swept-back wings which resemble a crescent or boomerang.

White-throated needletail, Hirundapus caudacutus
Pacific swift, Apus pacificus

Rails, gallinules, and cootsOrder: GruiformesFamily: Rallidae

Rallidae is a large family of small to medium-sized birds which includes the rails, crakes, coots and gallinules. Typically they inhabit dense vegetation in damp environments near lakes, swamps or rivers. In general they are shy and secretive birds, making them difficult to observe. Most species have strong legs and long toes which are well adapted to soft uneven surfaces. They tend to have short, rounded wings and to be weak fliers.

Brown-cheeked rail, Rallus indicus
Eurasian moorhen, Gallinula chloropus
Eurasian coot, Fulica atra
Watercock, Gallicrex cinerea
White-breasted waterhen, Amaurornis phoenicurus (A)
Ruddy-breasted crake, Zapornia fusca
Band-bellied crake, Zapornia paykullii (A)
Baillon's crake, Zapornia pusilla (A)
Swinhoe's rail, Coturnicops exquisitus (A)

CranesOrder: GruiformesFamily: Gruidae

Cranes are large, long-legged and long-necked birds. Unlike the similar-looking but unrelated herons, cranes fly with necks outstretched, not pulled back. Most have elaborate and noisy courting displays or "dances".

White-naped crane, Antigone vipio
Common crane, Grus grus
Hooded crane, Grus monacha
Red-crowned crane, Grus japonensis

Stilts and avocetsOrder: CharadriiformesFamily: Recurvirostridae

Recurvirostridae is a family of large wading birds, which includes the avocets and stilts. The avocets have long legs and long up-curved bills. The stilts have extremely long legs and long, thin, straight bills.

Black-winged stilt, Himantopus himantopus (A)
Pied avocet, Recurvirostra avosetta (A)

OystercatchersOrder: CharadriiformesFamily: Haematopodidae

The oystercatchers are large and noisy plover-like birds, with strong bills used for smashing or prising open molluscs. 

Eurasian oystercatcher, Haematopus ostralegus

Plovers and lapwingsOrder: CharadriiformesFamily: Charadriidae

The family Charadriidae includes the plovers, dotterels and lapwings. They are small to medium-sized birds with compact bodies, short, thick necks and long, usually pointed, wings. They are found in open country worldwide, mostly in habitats near water.

Black-bellied plover, Pluvialis squatarola
Pacific golden-plover, Pluvialis fulva
Northern lapwing, Vanellus vanellus
Gray-headed lapwing, Vanellus cinereus (A)
Lesser sand-plover, Charadrius mongolus
Greater sand-plover, Charadrius leschenaultii (A)
Kentish plover, Charadrius alexandrinus
Common ringed plover, Charadrius hiaticula (A)
Long-billed plover, Charadrius placidus
Little ringed plover, Charadrius dubius

Sandpipers and alliesOrder: CharadriiformesFamily: Scolopacidae

Scolopacidae is a large diverse family of small to medium-sized shorebirds including the sandpipers, curlews, godwits, shanks, tattlers, woodcocks, snipes, dowitchers and phalaropes. The majority of these species eat small invertebrates picked out of the mud or soil. Variation in length of legs and bills enables multiple species to feed in the same habitat, particularly on the coast, without direct competition for food. 

Whimbrel, Numenius phaeopus
Little curlew, Numenius minutus (A)
Far Eastern curlew, Numenius madagascariensis
Eurasian curlew, Numenius arquata
Bar-tailed godwit, Limosa lapponica
Black-tailed godwit, Limosa limosa
Ruddy turnstone, Arenaria interpres
Great knot, Calidris tenuirostris
Red knot, Calidris canutus
Ruff, Calidris alba (A)
Broad-billed sandpiper, Calidris falcinellus
Sharp-tailed sandpiper, Calidris acuminata
Curlew sandpiper, Calidris ferruginea (A)
Temminck's stint, Calidris temminckii
Long-toed stint, Calidris subminuta (A)
Spoon-billed sandpiper, Calidris pygmeus (A)
Red-necked stint, Calidris ruficollis
Sanderling, Calidris alba (A)
Dunlin, Calidris alpina
Little stint, Calidris minuta (A)
Pectoral sandpiper, Calidris melanotos (A)
Western sandpiper, Calidris mauri (A)
Eurasian woodcock, Scolopax rusticola
Solitary snipe, Gallinago solitaria
Common snipe, Gallinago gallinago
Pin-tailed snipe, Gallinago stenura (A)
Swinhoe's snipe, Gallinago megala (A)
Terek sandpiper, Xenus cinereus
Red-necked phalarope, Phalaropus lobatus (A)
Common sandpiper, Actitis hypoleucos
Green sandpiper, Tringa ochropus
Gray-tailed tattler, Tringa brevipes
Wandering tattler, Tringa incana (A)
Spotted redshank, Tringa erythropus
Common greenshank, Tringa nebularia
Nordmann's greenshank, Tringa guttifer (A)
Marsh sandpiper, Tringa stagnatilis (A)
Wood sandpiper, Tringa glareola
Common redshank, Tringa totanus

ButtonquailOrder: CharadriiformesFamily: Turnicidae

The buttonquail are small, drab, running birds which resemble the true quails. The female is the brighter of the sexes and initiates courtship. The male incubates the eggs and tends the young.

Yellow-legged buttonquail, Turnix tanki

Pratincoles and coursersOrder: CharadriiformesFamily: Glareolidae

Glareolidae is a family of wading birds comprising the pratincoles, which have short legs, long pointed wings and long forked tails, and the coursers, which have long legs, short wings and long, pointed bills which curve downwards.

Oriental pratincole, Glareola maldivarum (A)

Auks, murres, and puffinsOrder: CharadriiformesFamily: Alcidae

Alcids are superficially similar to penguins due to their black-and-white colours, their upright posture and some of their habits, however they are not related to the penguins and differ in being able to fly. Auks live on the open sea, only deliberately coming ashore to nest. 

Common murre, Uria aalge
Spectacled guillemot, Cepphus carbo
Long-billed murrelet, Brachyramphus perdix (A)
Ancient murrelet, Synthliboramphus antiquus
Rhinoceros auklet, Cerorhinca monocerata

Gulls, terns, and skimmersOrder: CharadriiformesFamily: Laridae

Laridae is a family of medium to large seabirds, the gulls, terns, and skimmers. Gulls are typically grey or white, often with black markings on the head or wings. They have stout, longish bills and webbed feet. Terns are a group of generally medium to large seabirds typically with grey or white plumage, often with black markings on the head. Most terns hunt fish by diving but some pick insects off the surface of fresh water. Terns are generally long-lived birds, with several species known to live in excess of 30 years.

Black-legged kittiwake, Rissa tridactyla (A)
Saunders's gull, Chroicocephalus saundersi
Black-headed gull, Chroicocephalus ridibundus
Relict gull, Ichthyaetus relictus (A)
Black-tailed gull, Larus crassirostris
Common gull, Larus canus
Herring gull, Larus argentatus
Lesser black-backed gull, Larus fuscus
Slaty-backed gull, Larus schistisagus (A)
Glaucous gull, Larus hyperboreus
Little tern, Sternula albifrons
Caspian tern, Hydroprogne caspia (A)
White-winged tern, Chlidonias leucopterus (A)
Whiskered tern, Chlidonias hybrida (A)
Common tern, Sterna hirundo

LoonsOrder: GaviiformesFamily: Gaviidae

Loons, known as divers in Europe, are a group of aquatic birds found in many parts of North America and northern Europe. They are the size of a large duck or small goose, which they somewhat resemble when swimming, but to which they are completely unrelated. There are 5 species worldwide and 4 species which occur in North Korea.

Red-throated loon, Gavia stellata (A)
Arctic loon, Gavia arctica
Pacific loon, Gavia pacifica (A)
Yellow-billed loon, Gavia adamsii (A)

Shearwaters and petrelsOrder: ProcellariiformesFamily: Procellariidae

The procellariids are the main group of medium-sized "true petrels", characterised by united nostrils with medium septum and a long outer functional primary.

Streaked shearwater, Calonectris leucomelas
Flesh-footed shearwater, Ardenna carneipes  (A)
Short-tailed shearwater, Ardenna tenuirostris  (A)

StorksOrder: CiconiiformesFamily: Ciconiidae

Storks are large, long-legged, long-necked, wading birds with long, stout bills. Storks are mute, but bill-clattering is an important mode of communication at the nest. Their nests can be large and may be reused for many years. Many species are migratory.

Black stork, Ciconia nigra
Oriental stork, Ciconia boyciana (A)

FrigatebirdsOrder: SuliformesFamily: Fregatidae

Frigatebirds are large seabirds usually found over tropical oceans. They are large, black-and-white or completely black, with long wings and deeply forked tails. The males have coloured inflatable throat pouches. They do not swim or walk and cannot take off from a flat surface. Having the largest wingspan-to-body-weight ratio of any bird, they are essentially aerial, able to stay aloft for more than a week.

Lesser frigatebird, Fregata ariel (A)

Cormorants and shagsOrder: SuliformesFamily: Phalacrocoracidae

Phalacrocoracidae is a family of medium to large coastal, fish-eating seabirds that includes cormorants and shags. Plumage colouration varies, with the majority having mainly dark plumage, some species being black-and-white and a few being colourful.

Pelagic cormorant, Urile pelagicus
Great cormorant, Phalacrocorax carbo
Japanese cormorant, Phalacrocorax capillatus

PelicansOrder: PelecaniformesFamily: Pelecanidae

Pelicans are large water birds with a distinctive pouch under their beak. As with other members of the order Pelecaniformes, they have webbed feet with four toes.

Dalmatian pelican, Pelecanus crispus (A)

Herons, egrets, and bitternsOrder: PelecaniformesFamily: Ardeidae

The family Ardeidae contains the bitterns, herons, and egrets. Herons and egrets are medium to large wading birds with long necks and legs. Bitterns tend to be shorter necked and more wary. Members of Ardeidae fly with their necks retracted, unlike other long-necked birds such as storks, ibises and spoonbills.

Great bittern, Botaurus stellaris
Yellow bittern, Ixobrychus sinensis
Schrenck's bittern, Ixobrychus eurhythmus
Gray heron, Ardea cinerea
Purple heron, Ardea purpurea
Great egret, Ardea alba
Intermediate egret, Ardea intermedia (A)
Chinese egret, Egretta eulophotes
Little egret, Egretta garzetta
Pacific reef-heron, Egretta sacra (A)
Cattle egret, Bubulcus ibis (A)
Chinese pond-heron, Ardeola bacchus (A)
Striated heron, Butorides striata
Black-crowned night-heron, Nycticorax nycticorax (A)

Ibises and spoonbillsOrder: PelecaniformesFamily: Threskiornithidae

Threskiornithidae is a family of large terrestrial and wading birds which includes the ibises and spoonbills. They have long, broad wings with 11 primary and about 20 secondary feathers. They are strong fliers and despite their size and weight, very capable soarers.

Crested ibis, Nipponia nippon (Ex)
Eurasian spoonbill, Platalea leucorodia (A)
Black-faced spoonbill, Platalea minor

OspreyOrder: AccipitriformesFamily: Pandionidae

The family Pandionidae contains only one species, the osprey. The osprey is a medium-large raptor which is a specialist fish-eater with a worldwide distribution.

Osprey, Pandion haliaetus

Hawks, eagles, and kitesOrder: AccipitriformesFamily: Accipitridae

Accipitridae is a family of birds of prey, which includes hawks, eagles, kites, harriers and Old World vultures. These birds have powerful hooked beaks for tearing flesh from their prey, strong legs, powerful talons and keen eyesight.

Bearded vulture, Gypaetus barbatus (A)
Oriental honey-buzzard, Pernis ptilorhynchus (A)
Cinereous vulture, Aegypius monachus (A)
Steppe eagle, Aquila nipalensis (A)
Imperial eagle, Aquila heliaca
Golden eagle, Aquila chrysaetos
Gray-faced buzzard, Butastur indicus
Eastern marsh-harrier, Circus spilonotus (A)
Hen harrier, Circus cyaneus
Pied harrier, Circus melanoleucos
Chinese sparrowhawk, Accipiter soloensis
Japanese sparrowhawk, Accipiter gularis
Eurasian sparrowhawk, Accipiter nisus
Northern goshawk, Accipiter gentilis
Black kite, Milvus migrans
White-tailed eagle, Haliaeetus albicilla
Steller's sea-eagle, Haliaeetus pelagicus (A)
Rough-legged hawk, Buteo lagopus
Eastern buzzard, Buteo japonicus
Upland buzzard, Buteo hemilasius

OwlsOrder: StrigiformesFamily: Strigidae

The typical owls are small to large solitary nocturnal birds of prey. They have large forward-facing eyes and ears, a hawk-like beak and a conspicuous circle of feathers around each eye called a facial disk.

Japanese scops-owl, Otus semitorques
Oriental scops-owl, Otus sunia
Eurasian eagle-owl, Bubo bubo
Northern hawk owl, Surnia ulula (A)
Little owl, Athene noctua (A)
Himalayan owl, Strix nivicolum
Ural owl, Strix uralensis (A)
Long-eared owl, Asio otus
Short-eared owl, Asio flammeus
Brown boobook, Ninox scutulata
Northern boobook, Ninox japonica

HoopoesOrder: BucerotiformesFamily: Upupidae

Hoopoes have black, white and orangey-pink colouring with a large erectile crest on their head.

Eurasian hoopoe, Upupa epops

KingfishersOrder: CoraciiformesFamily: Alcedinidae

Kingfishers are medium-sized birds with large heads, long, pointed bills, short legs and stubby tails. 

Common kingfisher, Alcedo atthis
Ruddy kingfisher, Halcyon coromanda
Black-capped kingfisher, Halcyon pileata
Crested kingfisher, Megaceryle lugubris (A)

RollersOrder: CoraciiformesFamily: Coraciidae

Rollers resemble crows in size and build, but are more closely related to the kingfishers and bee-eaters. They share the colourful appearance of those groups with blues and browns predominating. The two inner front toes are connected, but the outer toe is not.

Dollarbird, Eurystomus orientalis

WoodpeckersOrder: PiciformesFamily: Picidae

Woodpeckers are small to medium-sized birds with chisel-like beaks, short legs, stiff tails and long tongues used for capturing insects. Some species have feet with two toes pointing forward and two backward, while several species have only three toes. Many woodpeckers have the habit of tapping noisily on tree trunks with their beaks.

Eurasian wryneck, Jynx torquilla (A)
Eurasian three-toed woodpecker, Picoides tridactylus
Gray-capped pygmy woodpecker, Yungipicus canicapillus
Japanese pygmy woodpecker, Yungipicus kizuki
Rufous-bellied woodpecker, Dendrocopos hyperythrus (A)
White-backed woodpecker, Dendrocopos leucotos
Great spotted woodpecker, Dendrocopos major
Lesser spotted woodpecker, Dryobates minor
Gray-headed woodpecker, Picus canus
White-bellied woodpecker, Dryocopus javensis (A)
Black woodpecker, Dryocopus martius

Falcons and caracarasOrder: FalconiformesFamily: Falconidae

Falconidae is a family of diurnal birds of prey. They differ from hawks, eagles and kites in that they kill with their beaks instead of their talons. T

Eurasian kestrel, Falco tinnunculus
Amur falcon, Falco amurensis
Merlin, Falco columbarius
Eurasian hobby, Falco subbuteo
Peregrine falcon, Falco peregrinus

PittasOrder: PasseriformesFamily: Pittidae

Pittas are medium-sized by passerine standards and are stocky, with fairly long, strong legs, short tails and stout bills. Many are brightly coloured. They spend the majority of their time on wet forest floors, eating snails, insects and similar invertebrates.

Fairy pitta, Pitta nympha

CuckooshrikesOrder: PasseriformesFamily: Campephagidae

The cuckooshrikes are small to medium-sized passerine birds. They are predominantly greyish with white and black, although some species are brightly coloured. 

Ashy minivet, Pericrocotus divaricatus

Old World oriolesOrder: PasseriformesFamily: Oriolidae

The Old World orioles are colourful passerine birds. They are not related to the New World orioles.

Black-naped oriole, Oriolus chinensis

DrongosOrder: PasseriformesFamily: Dicruridae

The drongos are mostly black or dark grey in colour, sometimes with metallic tints. They have long forked tails, and some Asian species have elaborate tail decorations. They have short legs and sit very upright when perched, like a shrike. They flycatch or take prey from the ground.

Black drongo, Dicrurus macrocercus (A) 
Ashy drongo, Dicrurus leucophaeus (A)

Monarch flycatchersOrder: PasseriformesFamily: Monarchidae

The monarch flycatchers are small to medium-sized insectivorous passerines which hunt by flycatching.

Japanese paradise-flycatcher, Terpsiphone atrocaudata
Amur paradise-flycatcher, Terpsiphone incei

ShrikesOrder: PasseriformesFamily: Laniidae

Shrikes are passerine birds known for their habit of catching other birds and small animals and impaling the uneaten portions of their bodies on thorns. A typical shrike's beak is hooked, like a bird of prey. 

Tiger shrike, Lanius tigrinus
Bull-headed shrike, Lanius bucephalus
Brown shrike, Lanius cristatus
Northern shrike, Lanius borealis (A)
Chinese gray shrike, Lanius sphenocercus

Crows, jays, and magpiesOrder: PasseriformesFamily: Corvidae

The family Corvidae includes crows, ravens, jays, choughs, magpies, treepies, nutcrackers and ground jays. Corvids are above average in size among the Passeriformes, and some of the larger species show high levels of intelligence.

Eurasian jay, Garrulus glandarius
Azure-winged magpie, Cyanopica cyana
Oriental magpie, Pica serica
Eurasian nutcracker, Nucifraga caryocatactes
Daurian jackdaw, Corvus dauuricus
Rook, Corvus frugilegus
Carrion crow, Corvus corone
Large-billed crow, Corvus macrorhynchos
Common raven, Corvus corax (A)

Tits, chickadees and titmiceOrder: PasseriformesFamily: Paridae

The Paridae are mainly small stocky woodland species with short stout bills. Some have crests. They are adaptable birds, with a mixed diet including seeds and insects.

Coal tit, Periparus ater
Varied tit, Sittiparus varius
Marsh tit, Poecile palustris
Willow tit, Poecile montana
Japanese tit, Parus minor

Penduline-titsOrder: PasseriformesFamily: Remizidae

The penduline-tits are a group of small passerine birds related to the true tits. They are insectivores.

Chinese penduline-tit, Remiz consobrinus

LarksOrder: PasseriformesFamily: Alaudidae

Larks are small terrestrial birds with often extravagant songs and display flights. Most larks are fairly dull in appearance. Their food is insects and seeds.

Greater short-toed lark, Calandrella brachydactyla (A)
Asian short-toed lark, Alaudala cheleensis
Eurasian skylark, Alauda arvensis
Crested lark, Galerida cristata

Reed warblers and alliesOrder: PasseriformesFamily: Acrocephalidae

The members of this family are usually rather large for "warblers". Most are rather plain olivaceous brown above with much yellow to beige below. They are usually found in open woodland, reedbeds, or tall grass. The family occurs mostly in southern to western Eurasia and surroundings, but it also ranges far into the Pacific, with some species in Africa.

Thick-billed warbler, Arundinax aedon (A)
Black-browed reed warbler, Acrocephalus bistrigiceps
Oriental reed warbler, Acrocephalus orientalis

Grassbirds and alliesOrder: PasseriformesFamily: Locustellidae

Locustellidae are a family of small insectivorous songbirds found mainly in Eurasia, Africa, and the Australian region. They are smallish birds with tails that are usually long and pointed, and tend to be drab brownish or buffy all over.

Gray's grasshopper warbler, Helopsaltes fasciolatus (A)
Pallas's grasshopper warbler, Helopsaltes certhiola (A)
Middendorff's grasshopper warbler, Helopsaltes ochotensis
Pleske's grasshopper warbler, Helopsaltes pleskei (A)
Lanceolated warbler, Locustella lanceolata (A)
Baikal bush warbler, Locustella davidi (A)

SwallowsOrder: PasseriformesFamily: Hirundinidae

The family Hirundinidae is adapted to aerial feeding. They have a slender streamlined body, long pointed wings and a short bill with a wide gape. The feet are adapted to perching rather than walking, and the front toes are partially joined at the base.

Bank swallow, Riparia riparia (A)
Barn swallow, Hirundo rustica
Red-rumped swallow, Cecropis daurica
Asian house-martin, Delichon dasypus (A)

BulbulsOrder: PasseriformesFamily: Pycnonotidae

Bulbuls are medium-sized songbirds. Some are colourful with yellow, red or orange vents, cheeks, throats or supercilia, but most are drab, with uniform olive-brown to black plumage. Some species have distinct crests.

Light-vented bulbul, Pycnonotus sinensis (A)
Brown-eared bulbul, Hypsipetes amaurotis

Leaf warblersOrder: PasseriformesFamily: Phylloscopidae

Leaf warblers are a family of small insectivorous birds found mostly in Eurasia and ranging into Wallacea and Africa. The species are of various sizes, often green-plumaged above and yellow below, or more subdued with grayish-green to grayish-brown colors.

Yellow-browed warbler, Phylloscopus inornatus
Pallas's leaf warbler, Phylloscopus proregulus
Radde's warbler, Phylloscopus schwarzi
Dusky warbler, Phylloscopus fuscatus
Common chiffchaff, Phylloscopus collybita (A)
Eastern crowned warbler, Phylloscopus coronatus
Two-barred warbler, Phylloscopus plumbeitarsus
Pale-legged leaf warbler, Phylloscopus tenellipes
Arctic warbler, Phylloscopus borealis

Bush warblers and alliesOrder: PasseriformesFamily: Scotocercidae

The members of this family are found throughout Africa, Asia, and Polynesia. Their taxonomy is in flux, and some authorities place some genera in other families.

Asian stubtail, Urosphena squameiceps
Manchurian bush warbler, Horornis borealis

Long-tailed titsOrder: PasseriformesFamily: Aegithalidae

Long-tailed tits are a group of small passerine birds with medium to long tails. They make woven bag nests in trees. Most eat a mixed diet which includes insects.

Long-tailed tit, Aegithalos caudatus

Sylviid warblers, parrotbills, and alliesOrder: PasseriformesFamily: Sylviidae

The family Sylviidae is a group of small insectivorous passerine birds. They mainly occur as breeding species, as the common name implies, in Europe, Asia and, to a lesser extent, Africa. Most are of generally undistinguished appearance, but many have distinctive songs.

Lesser whitethroat, Curruca curruca (A)
Beijing babbler, Rhopophilus pekinensis (A)
Vinous-throated parrotbill, Sinosuthora webbiana

White-eyes, yuhinas, and AlliesOrder: PasseriformesFamily: Zosteropidae

The white-eyes are small and mostly undistinguished, their plumage above being generally some dull colour like greenish-olive, but some species have a white or bright yellow throat, breast or lower parts, and several have buff flanks. As their name suggests, many species have a white ring around each eye.

Chestnut-flanked white-eye, Zosterops erythropleurus

KingletsOrder: PasseriformesFamily: Regulidae

The kinglets, also called crests, are a small group of birds often included in the Old World warblers, but frequently given family status because they also resemble the titmice.

Goldcrest, Regulus regulus

NuthatchesOrder: PasseriformesFamily: Sittidae

Nuthatches are small woodland birds. They have the unusual ability to climb down trees head first, unlike other birds which can only go upwards. Nuthatches have big heads, short tails and powerful bills and feet. 

Eurasian nuthatch, Sitta europaea
Snowy-browed nuthatch, Sitta villosa

TreecreepersOrder: PasseriformesFamily: Certhiidae

Treecreepers are small woodland birds, brown above and white below. They have thin pointed down-curved bills, which they use to extricate insects from bark. They have stiff tail feathers, like woodpeckers, which they use to support themselves on vertical trees. 

Eurasian treecreeper, Certhia familiaris (A)

WrensOrder: PasseriformesFamily: Troglodytidae

The wrens are mainly small and inconspicuous except for their loud songs. These birds have short wings and thin down-turned bills. Several species often hold their tails upright. All are insectivorous.

Eurasian wren, Troglodytes troglodytes

DippersOrder: PasseriformesFamily: Cinclidae

Dippers are a group of perching birds whose habitat includes aquatic environments in the Americas, Europe and Asia. They are named for their bobbing or dipping movements. 

Brown dipper, Cinclus pallasii

StarlingsOrder: PasseriformesFamily: Sturnidae

Starlings are small to medium-sized passerine birds. Their flight is strong and direct and they are very gregarious. Their preferred habitat is fairly open country. They eat insects and fruit. Plumage is typically dark with a metallic sheen.

European starling, Sturnus vulgaris (A)
Daurian starling, Agropsar sturninus (A)
Chestnut-cheeked starling, Agropsar philippensis (A)
Red-billed starling, Spodiopsar sericeus (A)
White-cheeked starling, Spodiopsar cineraceus

Thrushes and alliesOrder: PasseriformesFamily: Turdidae

The thrushes are a group of passerine birds that occur mainly in the Old World. They are plump, soft plumaged, small to medium-sized insectivores or sometimes omnivores, often feeding on the ground. Many have attractive songs.

White's thrush, Zoothera aurea
Siberian thrush, Geokichla sibirica
Japanese thrush, Turdus cardis (A)
Gray-backed thrush, Turdus hortulorum
Eyebrowed thrush, Turdus obscurus
Brown-headed thrush, Turdus chrysolaus (A)
Pale thrush, Turdus pallidus
Red-throated thrush, Turdus ruficollis (A)
Dusky thrush, Turdus eunomus
Naumann's thrush, Turdus naumanni

Old World flycatchersOrder: PasseriformesFamily: Muscicapidae

Old World flycatchers are a large group of small passerine birds native to the Old World. They are mainly small arboreal insectivores. The appearance of these birds is highly varied, but they mostly have weak songs and harsh calls.

Gray-streaked flycatcher, Muscicapa griseisticta
Dark-sided flycatcher, Muscicapa sibirica
Asian brown flycatcher, Muscicapa dauurica
Blue-and-white flycatcher, Cyanoptila cyanomelana
Rufous-tailed robin, Larvivora sibilans
Japanese robin, Larvivora akahige (A)
Siberian blue robin, Larvivora cyane
Bluethroat, Luscinia svecica (A)
Siberian rubythroat, Calliope calliope (A)
Red-flanked bluetail, Tarsiger cyanurus
Yellow-rumped flycatcher, Ficedula zanthopygia
Green-backed flycatcher, Ficedula elisae (A) 
Narcissus flycatcher, Ficedula narcissina (A)
Mugimaki flycatcher, Ficedula mugimaki
Taiga flycatcher, Ficedula albicilla
Black redstart, Phoenicurus ochruros (A)
Daurian redstart, Phoenicurus auroreus
White-throated rock-thrush, Monticola gularis
Blue rock-thrush, Monticola solitarius
Amur stonechat, Saxicola stejnegeri
Pied wheatear, Oenanthe pleschanka (A)

WaxwingsOrder: PasseriformesFamily: Bombycillidae

The waxwings are a group of birds with soft silky plumage and unique red tips to some of the wing feathers. In the Bohemian and cedar waxwings, these tips look like sealing wax and give the group its name. These are arboreal birds of northern forests. They live on insects in summer and berries in winter. 

Bohemian waxwing, Bombycilla garrulus
Japanese waxwing, Bombycilla japonica (A)

AccentorsOrder: PasseriformesFamily: Prunellidae

The accentors are in the only bird family, Prunellidae, which is completely endemic to the Palearctic. They are small, fairly drab species superficially similar to sparrows. 

Alpine accentor, Prunella collaris
Siberian accentor, Prunella montanella

Old World sparrowsOrder: PasseriformesFamily: Passeridae

Old World sparrows are small passerine birds. In general, sparrows tend to be small, plump, brown or grey birds with short tails and short powerful beaks. Sparrows are seed eaters, but they also consume small insects.

Russet sparrow, Passer cinnamomeus (A)
Eurasian tree sparrow, Passer montanus

Wagtails and pipitsOrder: PasseriformesFamily: Motacillidae

Motacillidae is a family of small passerine birds with medium to long tails. They include the wagtails, longclaws and pipits. They are slender, ground feeding insectivores of open country.

Forest wagtail, Dendronanthus indicus
Gray wagtail, Motacilla cinerea
Eastern yellow wagtail, Motacilla tschutschensis
Japanese wagtail, Motacilla grandis (A)
White wagtail, Motacilla alba
Richard's pipit, Anthus richardi (A)
Blyth's pipit, Anthus godlewskii (A)
Olive-backed pipit, Anthus hodgsoni (A)
Pechora pipit, Anthus gustavi (A)
Red-throated pipit, Anthus cervinus
American pipit, Anthus rubescens (A)

Finches, euphonias, and alliesOrder: PasseriformesFamily: Fringillidae

Finches are seed-eating passerine birds, that are small to moderately large and have a strong beak, usually conical and in some species very large. All have twelve tail feathers and nine primaries. These birds have a bouncing flight with alternating bouts of flapping and gliding on closed wings, and most sing well.

Brambling, Fringilla montifringilla
Hawfinch, Coccothraustes coccothraustes
Yellow-billed grosbeak, Eophona migratoria
Japanese grosbeak, Eophona personata
Common rosefinch, Carpodacus erythrinus
Long-tailed rosefinch, Carpodacus sibiricus
Pallas's rosefinch, Carpodacus roseus
Pine grosbeak, Pinicola enucleator (A)
Eurasian bullfinch, Pyrrhula pyrrhula
Asian rosy-finch, Leucosticte arctoa
Oriental greenfinch, Chloris sinica
Hoary redpoll, Acanthis hornemanni
Red crossbill, Loxia curvirostra
Eurasian siskin, Spinus spinus

Longspurs and arctic buntingsOrder: PasseriformesFamily: Calcariidae

The Calcariidae are a group of passerine birds which had been traditionally grouped with the New World sparrows, but differ in a number of respects and are usually found in open grassy areas.

Lapland longspur, Calcarius lapponicus (A)

Old World buntingsOrder: PasseriformesFamily''': Emberizidae

The emberizids are a large family of passerine birds. They are seed-eating birds with distinctively shaped bills. Many emberizid species have distinctive head patterns.

Chestnut-eared bunting, Emberiza fucataRufous-backed bunting, Emberiza jankowskii (Ex)
Meadow bunting, Emberiza cioidesPine bunting, Emberiza leucocephalos (A)
Yellow-throated bunting, Emberiza elegansOchre-rumped bunting, Emberiza yessoensis (A)
Pallas's bunting, Emberiza pallasiReed bunting, Emberiza schoeniclusYellow-breasted bunting, Emberiza aureolaLittle bunting, Emberiza pusilla (A)
Rustic bunting, Emberiza rusticaYellow bunting, Emberiza sulphurata (A)
Black-faced bunting, Emberiza spodocephalaChestnut bunting, Emberiza rutilaYellow-browed bunting, Emberiza chrysophrys (A)
Tristram's bunting, Emberiza tristrami''

See also
List of birds
Lists of birds by region

References

North Korea
North Korea
 
Birds